Rezia (minor planet designation: 528 Rezia) is a minor planet orbiting the Sun.   It was discovered by Max Wolf on March 20, 1904.  It is named for a character in the 1826 opera Oberon by Carl Maria von Weber.  Among the 248 discoveries by Wolf, he also discovered 527 Euryanthe and 529 Preziosa on the same day.

The mostly likely source for the name of the asteroid is the character Rezia in Carl Maria von Weber's opera Oberon, given that around 1904 the astronomer was frequently using the names of female opera characters for the asteroids he discovered.

In 1907, August Kopff's November 1 sighting of the provisionally designated 1907 AQ was instead determined to be 528 Rezia.

In 1987, it was reported that Rezia has a flat spectrum and IRAS albedo value pv=0.54 ± 0.0004, which is very dark and consistent with a C-type asteroid.

References

External links 
 
 

000528
Discoveries by Max Wolf
Named minor planets
19040320